Al-Bayan is the Islamic State's official radio station, based in Iraq, owned and operated by the Islamic State, which broadcast at 92.5 on the FM dial. The station aired a news-talk format and broadcasts in the Arabic, Kurdish, English, French, and Russian languages.

Originating from Mosul, al-Bayan programs were credited with being "highly professional and slickly produced" and were sometimes compared to NPR and the BBC for tone and quality. Al-Bayan's reporting on ISIS military operations had been referenced by the Associated Press and The Washington Post''. The station stopped broadcasts after ISIS lost most of its bases in Iraq and Syria.

Broadcasts by IS resumed later from Sirte, Libya under the station name "Radio Al-Tawheed".

Beginnings
The first broadcast of Al-Bayan Radio was launched in late 2014, which initially provided newscasts, then some other programs were added in April 2015. The station offered a wide range of programming including nasheed, Quran recitations, speeches, Fiqh, language instruction, and interview shows, interspersed with regular news bulletins and field reports from al-Bayan correspondents in Iraq and Syria. English-language news bulletins were delivered by an American-accented, male newsreader and datelines are read in the Islamic calendar.

Android application 
In early 2016, Al-Bayan released a Android application, they uploaded the APK file on the Internet Archive and onion websites since you couldn't download the app on the Google Play Store.  They spread the app through social media like Twitter, Facebook, and Telegram.

Frequencies
Known frequencies (October 2016) were:

Iraq: Mosul 92.5/99.3 FM;
Syria: Raqqah 99.9 FM
Libya: Benghazi 94.3 FM (irregular)
Libya: Darnah 95.5 FM (irregular)

The station in Mosul was reported to have gone off-air after an air strike on it in late February 2017 as part of the Battle of Mosul. Iraqi forces discovered the station in March 2017 in an upscale western Mosul neighborhood they captured. ISIS had burnt it down before fleeing.

Libyan broadcasts
In February 2015, IS captured a radio station called "Makmadas" in Sirte, Libya. It was nominally run by Ansar Al-Sharia in Libya, which made it unclear whether that station was under IS management. An IS-owned satellite television station and a powerful radio station on 94.3 FM, also based out of Sirte and operating under the brand name "Al-Tawheed," began broadcasting the previous October 2014. Radio Al-Tawheed (former Libyan Jamahiriya Broadcasting Corporation transmitter) have 10 kilowatts output power and is received in Europe via sporadic E propagation.

The station operated in 2015 and 2016 before being overrun by Libyan forces.

See also
Dabiq Magazine
Media of Iraq

References

 
Radio stations established in 2014
Islamic State of Iraq and the Levant mass media
News and talk radio stations
Russian-language radio stations
Arabic-language radio stations
English-language radio stations
French-language radio stations
Talk radio stations
Kurdish-language radio stations
Urdu-language radio stations
Turkish-language radio stations
Pirate radio stations